Yevgeni Yuryevich Staver (born 16 February 1998) is a Russian football player. He plays for FC Yenisey Krasnoyarsk.

Club career
He made his debut in the Russian Football National League for FC Olimp-Dolgoprudny on 14 August 2021 in a game against FC Yenisey Krasnoyarsk.

References

External links
 
 
 Profile by Russian Football National League

1998 births
Sportspeople from Irkutsk
Living people
Russian footballers
Association football goalkeepers
FC Baikal Irkutsk players
FC Sibir Novosibirsk players
FC Olimp-Dolgoprudny players
FC Yenisey Krasnoyarsk players
Russian First League players
Russian Second League players